BACPAC, or the Berkeley Advanced Chip Performance Calculator, is a software program to explore the effect of changes in IC technology. The use enters a set of fairly fundamental properties of the technology (such as interconnect layer thickness, and logic depth) and the program estimates the system level performance of an IC built with these assumptions. BACPAC is based on the work in.

BACPAC uses analytical approximations for system properties such as delay and interconnect requirements.  The intent is not absolute accuracy for a given design, but to show trends and effects of technology changes.

Inputs to BACPAC
Interconnect
Number of routing layers
Pitches (center to center distance of each layer)
Resistivity of the wires
Dielectric constant of the insulators between the layers
Device
Vdd, also called supply voltage
Vt, also called threshold voltage
Gate oxide thickness of the MOS transistors
Drain current
Fan-in (number of inputs for each gate, on the average)
System-level
Block design size (number of gates in each block)
Silicon efficiency (depends on design style - custom, ASIC, gate array, and so on)
logic depth  (number of gates between state elements)
Rent's exponent (how the number of connections varies with block size - see Rent's rule.)

BACPAC outputs
Delay analysis
Chip area
Maximum clock frequency - how fast the chip can run
Optimized device sizes  - estimated devices sizes to make it run this fast
Interconnect RC
Average wirelength (local & global)
Ratio of wire delay to gate delay
Noise analysis
Clock frequency with noise
Newly optimized device sizes for the clock distribution network
Ratio of wire delay to gate delay
Wirability analysis
Wiring capacity
Wiring requirements (global & local),
Wiring needs for clock distribution
Wiring needs for the power distribution network 
Power analysis
Total power consumption, divided into sub-categories:
Clock         (power needed to distribute the clock across the chip)
I/O           (power needed to get needed signals on and off the chip)
memory        (power needed to retain and access data in the internal memories)
global wiring (power dissipated in the global wiring)
logic         (power dissipated in the logic gates themselves)
short-circuit (power wasted inside the gates from pull-up and pull down transistors fighting each other during switching)
leakage       (power that flows through the gate even when it is not switching)
Yield analysis
Projected yields for excellent, average, and poor process control using a negative binomial yield mode

References

External links
 Main BACPAC web site

Electronic design automation software